George Brown (June 27, 1830 – March 22, 1909) was a member of the Wisconsin State Assembly.

Biography
Brown was born on June 27, 1830, in South Cerney, England. He settled in Grant County, Wisconsin, in 1855. During the American Civil War, he served with the 42nd Wisconsin Volunteer Infantry Regiment of the Union Army. Brown died on March 22, 1909.

Assembly career
Brown was a member of the Assembly in 1876. He was a Republican.

References

People from South Cerney
English emigrants to the United States
19th-century English politicians
People from Grant County, Wisconsin
Republican Party members of the Wisconsin State Assembly
People of Wisconsin in the American Civil War
1830 births
1909 deaths
19th-century American politicians